Repovesi National Park is situated in the municipalities of Kouvola and Mäntyharju, only a few hours north-east of the more populous Helsinki area of southern Finland. Formerly a site for intensive commercial forestry, the Repovesi area successfully transformed into a pristine national park. Pine and birch trees dominate the park. Repovesi abounds with wildlife including bear, deer and various birds. The River Koukunjoki flows through the park. Other streams and lakes are also situated within the parks boundaries.

Attractions include the Olhavanvuori hill, popular among climbers, and the Kultareitti water taxi route. Also located in the park are the Kuutinlahti bay with its restored timber rafting channels, the Lapinsalmi suspension bridge, and many observation towers.

The common fauna of the park includes the red-throated diver, the Eurasian lynx, the moose, many owls and several galliformes.

See also 
 List of national parks of Finland
 Protected areas of Finland

References

External links
 
 Outdoors.fi – Repovesi National Park
 Official site
 A gem of nature in southeastern Finland- Repovesi in thisisFINLAND

Kouvola
National parks of Finland
Protected areas established in 2003
Geography of Kymenlaakso
Tourist attractions in Kymenlaakso
Geography of South Savo
Tourist attractions in South Savo